Vibra may refer to:

Vibra Healthcare, Pennsylvania
Doxycycline (redirect from Vibra-Tabs)
Vibras (album)  J. Balvin 2018
La Vibra digital publication in Spanish based in the United States
Vibra Bank former bank in Chula Vista, California
Vibraslap (redirect from Vibra-slap)
Vibra São Paulo (formerly known as Credicard Hall)  music theatre in São Paulo, Brazil